is a Japanese manga series written by Kaiu Shirai and illustrated by Posuka Demizu. It was serialized in Shueisha's Weekly Shōnen Jump from August 2016 to June 2020, with its chapters collected in 20 tankōbon volumes. In North America, Viz Media licensed the manga for English release and serialized it on their digital Weekly Shonen Jump magazine. The series follows a group of orphaned children in their plan to escape from their orphanage, after learning the dark truth behind their existence and the purpose of the orphanage.

The Promised Neverland was adapted into an anime television series produced by CloverWorks and broadcast on Fuji TV's Noitamina programming block. The series' first season ran for 12 episodes from January to March 2019. A second season ran for 11 episodes from January to March 2021. A live-action film adaptation was released in December 2020. Amazon Studios is also developing an American live-action series.

In 2018, the manga won the 63rd Shogakukan Manga Award in the shōnen category. By August 2022, The Promised Neverland had over 41 million copies in circulation, including digital versions, making it one of the best-selling manga series of all time. The manga has been overall well received by critics, in particularly for its storytelling, characters and world-building. The anime series' first season was well received, being considered as one of the best of 2010s. The second season, however, received negative reception, with criticisms to its rushed pacing and simplification of the original manga's plot.

Synopsis

Setting
In a strange world filled with sentient creatures of different species, an agreement called "The Promise" was made to end a long war between humans and the so-called demons. "The Promise" was an agreement where each would live in their own separate "worlds": the human world, free from the threat of demons; and the demon world, where human breeding farms were set up to provide food for the demons. By eating humans, demons take on their attributes which prevent them from degenerating into mindless monsters. In the demon world, a special breeding program was set up under the guise of orphanages; there, a human "Mother" would oversee the children to make sure they grew up as intelligent as possible. These children had identifying numbers tattooed on them and had no knowledge of the outside world. They believed that they were orphans and once they reached a certain age or intelligence, they would be taken out for adoption, but were fed to high-ranking demons instead.

Plot

In the year 2045, 1,000 years after the formation of "The Promise", the bright and cheerful Emma is an 11-year-old orphan living in Grace Field House, a self-contained orphanage housing her and 37 other orphans. They lead an idyllic life, with plentiful food, plush beds, clean clothes, games and the love of their "Mom", Isabella. Their education is seen as an important part of their development, and Emma with her two best friends Norman and Ray, always excel in the regular exams. The orphans are allowed complete freedom, except to venture beyond the perimeter wall or gate which separate the house from the outside world. One night, a girl named Conny is sent away to be "adopted", but Emma and Norman follow with her favorite stuffed animal toy. At the gate, they find Conny dead and discover the truth about their existence in this idyllic orphanage – to be raised as meat for demons. Emma and Norman plan with Ray to escape from Grace Field House with the children, but Norman is taken off to be "adopted". Emma and Ray then decide to escape with some of their older siblings, leaving half of the younger children behind. 

The escapees find life outside Grace Field House is filled with dangers, but under the leadership of Emma and Ray, they become determined to return to free their remaining siblings, along with children from the other Farms. They encounter demons of all descriptions, including Mujika and Sonju who aid them in their quest. Emma and Ray later meet up again with Norman and together with their allies, they fight a battle for freedom against the demon queen Legravalima and the human Peter Ratri who manages the Farms. Eventually, through her own determination, Emma secures the freedom of all the children and re-forges "The Promise", bringing all of them to the human world, but at the cost of her own memory.

Production

Development
The series' first conception originated by the end of 2013, from a draft originally simply titled Neverland, but was later changed to The Promised Neverland after running into some copyright issues. Kaiu Shirai brought the 300-page The Promised Neverland draft to the Weekly Shōnen Jump editorial department. Suguru Sugita, the editor of The Promised Neverland, said that "the series was an ambitious work that did not seem like a Jump manga, with both bright and dark scenes that needed a world of fantasy that would also create suspense". According to Shirai, Sugita suggested to complete the series in twelve volumes; "a size around that of Death Note manga is enough, no longer than that".

They had difficulties trying to find an artist whose style could match the story, ranging from famous illustrators to new and upcoming talent. Shirai considered Posuka Demizu as one of the candidates, as he and Sugita felt that her art was the best fit for the series' imagery. Some candidates turned down the offer, giving comments like that "the story did not feel like a Jump manga", or that "it would not become a hit", so they were "really happy and excited" when Demizu agreed to work on it. Sugita said that Shirai and Demizu had a kind of synergy similar to Tsugumi Ohba and Takeshi Obata, the creators of Death Note. Before The Promised Neverland began its serialization, Shirai and Demizu published the one-shot  on the Shōnen Jump+ online platform in February 2016. The one-shot was popular among readers and Sugita expressed that they were the right team for The Promised Neverland.

Inspirations
Shirai was inspired by children's folklore books from all over the world and video games like Final Fantasy for the series' setting creation, while for the horror elements, he said that he only used his imagination because he did not like horror films. He also mentioned that part of the story came from some nightmares that he had as a child, especially after having read Hansel and Gretel, stories about children being eaten, and a manga focused on spirits that made him ask himself if the monsters could solve their problems if they raised humans like cattle. Shirai said: "All these fears, ideas, influences, have come together. This is how the story of The Promised Neverland was born".

Demizu said that the Japanese folklore and its monsters were a first source of inspiration, also citing European fairy tales like Little Red Riding Hood and Hansel and Gretel. She also mentioned Naoki Urasawa's Monster, Ghibli's universe and prison escape films, like Escape from Alcatraz, Papillon, The Great Escape and the American television series Prison Break.

The series' setting was inspired by the Victorian England, as Shirai expressed that he wanted to "destabilize the readers and to lead them on the false leads" by making them think that the story was set in an English orphanage in the 19th century. He also wanted to avoid situating the story in a very specific time frame. He had no particular reasons to choose England, but the Grace Field House orphanage name written in English in the text appealed to him. Shirai also said that "the European town planning is a benchmark, a very popular style highly appreciated for the Japanese". Demizu did a two-month language study trip to England when she was younger and took a lot of photos that she used as a reference for the series. She was particularly impressed by the English forests and atmosphere.

Concepts and themes
Regarding the title and its relation to Neverland, the fictional island of Peter Pan created by J. M. Barrie, Shirai said that it is a magical, fairy tale place to have fun thanks to Peter Pan, but that half the place is dark and dangerous. He said that these two parts, "the cohabitation of childish playfulness" and "the dangerous shadow that hovers at the bottom" are factors that he tried to transcribe through The Promised Neverland. Shirai and his editor wanted to keep "Neverland" in the title, considering the story and its development. They then came up with “Promised” around the time they were working on the post-escape story. They considered the word to be important and agreed to also mention it in the plot.

Despite its dark tone, Shirai wanted to publish The Promised Neverland in Weekly Shōnen Jump instead of a seinen manga magazine because "the plot is not related to age, even if the themes of the story are dark, and that there was no reason to deprive the magazine's readership of a story due to an editorial line". He added that the series has canon shōnen manga themes, such as mutual aid or surpassing oneself. According to Shirai, the main characters are children because the magazine is mainly read by young readers, making it easier for the readers to relate to them, and the concept of children rebelling against adults was used because it is a classic theme in many stories. Although Shirai admitted that the story is darker than the majority of the Weekly Shōnen Jump manga, they avoided using "extreme trends" such as "ero-guro", "violence" or "nonsense", since, according to the series' editor, that would just make it "an ordinary manga", and they tried to include those essences as little as possible and use them only when they were necessary for the story.

Shirai said that the idea of students with the lowest grades being the first to leave the Farm to be eaten by the demons, while not necessarily a metaphor, was a way of inviting the reader to reflect on current society. Although Shirai admitted similarities between the series and the Japanese society and its school system, he said that "it is not meant to be an underlying critique and was rather an approach to daily life family, school and the way children look at adults". Despite some interpretations made by PETA, saying that the series is a pamphlet against mass farming and pro-vegetarians, Shirai expressed that he was not trying to imbue the work with moral values, and as an author, he was not in position to judge. He emphasized that it was never explicitly said that demons were bad people in the story. He further said: "That people make a connection with veganism and intensive breeding doesn't bother me, but our main goal is to create a story to entertain people, not to offer a moral judgment. Our manga is not a critique of the consumer society as such".

Writing
According to the official 2020 fan book, The Promised Neverland 0: Mystic Code, the writing process for the final chapters was affected by the COVID-19 pandemic. Shirai felt that the length of the chapters, particularly chapter 179 and the final chapter, limited the content that he wanted to include.

Media

Manga

The Promised Neverland is written by Kaiu Shirai and illustrated by Posuka Demizu. The manga was serialized in Shueisha's Weekly Shōnen Jump from August 1, 2016 to June 15, 2020. Shueisha collected its chapters in twenty tankōbon volumes, released from December 2, 2016 to October 2, 2020.

In July 2016, Viz Media announced that they would digitally publish the first three chapters of the series on Weekly Shonen Jump magazine. Thereafter, they published the manga's new chapters simultaneously with the Japanese release. The first printed volume in North America was released on December 5, 2017. Shueisha began to simulpublish the series in English on the website and app Manga Plus in January 2019.

A 16-page one-shot chapter about Ray titled, The First Shot was published in Weekly Shōnen Jump on October 5, 2020. A 36-page one-shot chapter about Sister Krone titled, Seeking the Sky of Freedom was published in Weekly Shōnen Jump on December 7, 2020. A 19-page one-shot chapter about the children accomplishing their dreams in the human world titled, Dreams Come True was released at "The Promised Neverland Special Exhibition", event that was held in Tokyo from December 11, 2020, to January 11, 2021. A 32-page one-shot chapter about Isabella titled, A Mother's Determination was published in Weekly Shōnen Jump on December 14, 2020. A 32-page one-shot, titled We Were Born, which tells the story of "another The Promised Neverland", was published in Weekly Shōnen Jump on January 4, 2021. Both Dreams Come True and We Were Born were collected in the Kaiu Shirai x Posuka Demizu: Beyond The Promised Neverland tankōbon volume published on September 3, 2021 by Shueisha. It was published on November 8, 2022 in North America by Viz Media.

A comedic spin-off titled , illustrated by Shuhei Miyazaki (Me & Roboco author), was published in Jump GIGA on July 26, 2018, and it was later serialized in the Shōnen Jump+ application from January 11 to March 28, 2019. Its chapters were collected in a single tankōbon volume, released on June 4, 2019.

Light novels
Four light novels by Nanao have been published. The first light novel, titled , was released on June 3, 2018. The second light novel, titled , was released on January 4, 2019. The third light novel, titled , was released on October 2, 2020. The story follows Lucas and Yuugo. The fourth light novel, titled , was released on December 4, 2020, and takes place after the manga's finale. The novel is about Emma, Norman and their friends talking about their memories.

Anime

An anime television series adaptation was announced in Weekly Shōnen Jump in May 2018. The series is animated by CloverWorks and directed by Mamoru Kanbe, with Toshiya Ono handling series composition, Kazuaki Shimada handling character designs, and Takahiro Obata composing the series' music. The series aired for 12 episodes from January 11 to March 29, 2019, on Fuji TV's late-night Noitamina anime programming block. It simulcasted on Amazon Video, but only in Japan, contrary to the contract giving Amazon exclusive streaming rights to shows that have aired on Noitamina since Spring 2016, as Wakanim has exclusive streaming rights in France. UVERworld performed the series' opening theme song "Touch Off", while Cö shu Nie performed the series' ending theme songs  and "Lamp".

A second season was announced in March 2019. Originally scheduled to premiere in October 2020, it was delayed due to the COVID-19 pandemic. The second season aired on Fuji TV's Noitamina from January 8 to March 26, 2021. The main staff and cast members returned to reprise their roles and the original manga writer Kaiu Shirai collaborated with the scripts and supervised an original scenario for the season, although the last two episodes of the second season did not contain any writing credits due to the backlash the season had received.  performed the second season's opening theme song , while Myuk performed the second season's ending theme song .

In North America, the series is licensed by Aniplex of America and it began streaming on Crunchyroll, Hulu, Funimation and Hidive on January 9, 2019. Funimation added the series' English dub to its streaming service on July 1, 2020. The anime's first season aired on Adult Swim's Toonami programming block starting on April 14, 2019. Toonami aired the entire first season on the broadcast night of October 31, 2020, as part of its Halloween marathon. Toonami aired another marathon the series on October 29, 2022, as part of its Halloween marathon. The second season premiered on Toonami on April 11, 2021. It has been available for streaming on Netflix in Japan, Italy, Singapore, and Thailand by August 2020; it began streaming on the platform in North America and Latin America on September 1 of the same year. On January 28, 2022, both seasons were made available to stream on Disney+ Japan. Madman Entertainment simulcasted the series on AnimeLab in Australia and New Zealand. The anime is licensed in the United Kingdom by Anime Limited.

The first season of the anime series substantially follows the manga and covers the story up to chapter 37, where the Jailbreak Arc ended. The second season is an abbreviated version of events which take place between chapters 38 and 181. There are also changes to the plot, the major ones being the omission of several arcs and characters.

Live-action film

A live-action film adaptation, directed by Yūichirō Hirakawa, was released in Japan on December 18, 2020. The film grossed ¥2,03 billion ($17.7 million) at the box office; and received mostly positive reviews from critics. It was nominated for two VFX-JAPAN Awards, winning one in the "Excellence Theatrical Film Award" category.

Live-action series
In June 2020, it was revealed that Amazon Studios and 20th Television is developing an English-language live-action series adaptation of the manga for Amazon Prime Video. Spider Man: Into the Spider-Verse's Rodney Rothman is directing the series and Meghan Malloy is writing the pilot. Rothman, along with Death Note producer Masi Oka, and Vertigo Entertainment's Roy Lee and Miri Yoon are the executive producers of the series.

Video games
A mobile game based on the series called The Promised Neverland: Escape the Hunting Grounds was released on April 22, 2021. The game was announced on January 7, 2021, and by April 13, 2021 had received over 63,194 pre-registrations. The game is an online escape game, in which four players work together to escape a map based on The Promised Neverland series. Players control different characters, and they can use a variety of weapons and items to defeat demons. The game is developed by GOODROID and published by CyberAgent and is available on iOS and Android.

A crossover event between The Promised Neverland and the mobile game Dragon Egg was held on May 22, 2020. A crossover with the mobile game Vivid Army was held from November 12–26, 2020. A crossover event with the video game Identity V was released on February 23, 2021. A second crossover event with Identity V was released on September 24, 2021. A crossover event, with the Japanese mobile game Jumputi Heroes, was released on March 15, 2021. A collaboration with the mobile game LINE POP2 was released on May 27, 2021.

Other media 
An art book, titled , was released on November 4, 2020. It was published by Viz Media on June 21, 2022. It included creator commentary and interviews. A fan book, titled , was released on December 4, 2020.

An art exhibition, The Promised Neverland Special Exhibition, was held at the Mori Art Museum in Roppongi from December 11, 2020, to January 11, 2021. Additionally, a cafe event called "Cafe Grace Field" was held next to the exhibition venue. The design of the cafe was based on Grace Field House and sold various foods and drinks based on the series. The exhibition was held again from March 17 to April 5, 2021 in Osaka. From April 24 to May 9, 2021, it was held at the Nagoya Congress Center. From July 3–25, 2021, it was held in Okayama. From July 21 to August 16, 2021, it was held in Sapporo.

The series had an official podcast called "The Promised NeverRadio" which was hosted by Sumire Morohoshi the voice of Emma and Hiyori Kono the voice of Phil and ran for 66 episodes from January 7, 2019, to April 4, 2021. During the podcast Morohoshi and Kono would read emails and answer questions from fans. Fuji TV's anime programming block Noitamina celebrated its 15th anniversary with a special cinematic orchestra concert held at Tokyo International Forum, on May 29–30, 2021. The concert featured a line-up of the original soundtrack from the anime series that play during iconic scenes. Noitamina Shop & Cafe Theater in Tokyo held a free screening of the anime series every Saturday and Sunday in January 2019, in addition to a cafe event that sold various foods and drinks based on the series. Noitamina Shop & Cafe Theater held another cafe event for the series from August 17 to September 1, 2019, to commemorate Emma's birthday. From January 15 to January 24, 2021, Noitamina Shop & Cafe Theater held a cafe event to commemorate Ray's birthday. From March 13 to March 28, 2021, Noitamina Shop & Cafe Theater held a cafe event to commemorate Norman's birthday.

On July 14, 2018, the series got its own themed drink and coaster at the Shonen Jump cafe in Roppongi. The series did a crossover with the WIXOSS trading card game on April 20, 2019, which included an expansion pack themed to the series. The project was overseen by the manga's illustrator, Posuka Demizu, who had contributed art to the trading card game's cards in the past. The series did a collaboration with The Sky Circus Sunshine 60 Observation Deck in Tokyo from January 5 to February 11, 2019. The collaboration included a photo spot that recreates the post-apocalyptic world of the series, an art exhibition, limited edition goods, and original drinks inspired by Emma, Norman, and Ray. A collaboration with Princess Cafe was held in Ikebukuro, Akihabara, Osaka and Fukuoka from August 10 to September 8, 2019. The collaboration featured exclusive merchandise, food and drinks based on the series. A collaboration with Cookpad Studio was held in Osaka from September 4–30, 2020. The event included food and merchandise based on the series. A collaboration with Kanagawa Taxi Co., also known as Kanachu Taxi, was held from January 14 to March 17, 2021, in which artwork of characters from The Promised Neverland was placed on 88 of their taxi cars and customers were given artwork featuring Emma, Ray, and Norman. A collaboration with Megane Flower glasses was held on March 8, 2021, which included limited edition glasses frames designed after Emma, Ray, and Norman. A collaboration with Sony was released on September 2, 2021, and included limited edition electronic merchandise based on the series.

A collaboration between The Promised Neverland and Collabo Cafe Honpo was held in Akihabara and Nihonbashi from February 14 to March 8, 2020. The collaboration included original merchandise, food and drinks based on the series. A collaboration with Collabo Cafe Honpo LABO was held at the Ikebukuro East Exit Store in Kanto, Tokyo from August 8 - September 6, 2020. The event celebrated Emma's birthday and featured Emma, Norman, and Ray as plushies. The café runs under the same company as Collabo Cafe Honpo, but is a space that is specifically used for figures and plushies that customers can bring to do photo-shoots with miniature (inedible) foods, drinks, and tables. A traveling real-life escape game organized by SCRAP based on the series called "The Promised Neverland: Escape From The False Paradise" began touring Japan in March 2019. A second traveling real-life escape game organized by SCRAP based on the series called "The Promised Neverland: Escape From The Man-Eating Forest" began touring Japan on July 8, 2021. An event, in collaboration with Greenland Amusement Park in Arao, Kumamoto, called "Infiltrate the Greenland Farm" started on March 20 and was held until June 6, 2021. The event featured exclusive merchandise, food, and rides based on the series. A collaboration with Hotel Keihan at six different locations in Japan ran from June 1 to August 29, 2021. The collaboration featured six concept rooms nationwide with life-sized characters, animated setting pictures, original merchandise, voices from Emma, Norman, and Ray, and a mini exhibition. Due to the events popularity, original goods from the collaboration continued to be sold until March 31, 2022. A hands-on, experience-based, immersive event called "Experience Museum The Promised Neverland Grace Field House Escape Edition" was held in Roppongi from July 17 to December 30, 2021. The event included an exhibition featuring a life sized replica of Grace Field House, various props, and characters from the series, as well as original merchandise. A cafe event called "Minerva Cafe" was held within the museum and sold various foods and drinks based on the series. A pop-up shop to promote the series was held at six different Loft Stores across Japan from February 11 to May 10, 2021. Another pop-up shop selling series-themed merchandise was open at the Tokyo Anime Center from January 21 to February 6, 2022.

Reception

Manga
On Takarajimasha's Kono Manga ga Sugoi! ranking of top manga of 2018 for male readers, The Promised Neverland topped the list. The series won the "Shōnen Tournament 2018" by the editorial staff of the French website Manga-News. The manga was one of the Jury Recommended Works for the French 12th ACBD's Prix Asie de la Critique 2018. The Promised Neverland was one of the Jury Recommended Works in the Manga Division at the 21st Japan Media Arts Festival in 2018. The series was chosen as one of the Best Manga at the Comic-Con International Best & Worst Manga of 2018. The Promised Neverland has been added to The Nippon Foundation's Manga Edutainment 2020 list, to identify manga that are published as general works but can also open up new worlds and lead to learning.

On Da Vinci'''s magazine "Book of the Year" list, The Promised Neverland ranked 26th on the 2018 list; 35th on the 2019 list; 18th on the 2020 list; and 26th on the 2021 list. On TV Asahi's Manga Sōsenkyo 2021 poll, in which 150.000 people voted for their top 100 manga series, The Promised Neverland ranked 46th. Barnes & Noble listed The Promised Neverland on their list of "Our Favorite Manga of 2018". The Promised Neverland was included on the American Library Association's list of Great Graphic Novels for Teens in 2018; and 2019. On a 2021 survey conducted by LINE Research asking Japanese high school students "what manga series they are currently into", The Promised Neverland ranked second among girls, and 10th among boys.

The manga was recommended by manga artists Osamu Akimoto and Eiichiro Oda, who each wrote praising comments which were featured on the obi of the series' second and fourth volumes, respectively. Author Toshio Okada have also praised and recommended the manga.

SalesThe Promised Neverland was the 24th top-selling franchise in Japan in 2018, with estimated sales of ¥1.9 billion. It was the seventh best-selling franchise in 2019, with estimated sales of ¥3.8 billion. It was the 10th best-selling franchise in 2020, with estimated sales of ¥3.5 billion.

As of August 2017, the manga had 1.5 million copies in circulation. By October 2017, the number increased to 2.1 million copies in circulation. By April 2018, the first 8 volumes had 4.2 million copies in circulation. By June 2018, the first 9 volumes had 5 million copies in circulation. By January 2019, the first 12 volumes had 8.8 million copies in circulation. By September 2019, the manga had over 16 million copies in circulation. By June 2020, the manga had over 21 million copies in circulation. By October 2020, the manga had over 25 million copies in circulation. By December 2020, the manga had over 26 million copies in circulation. By April 2021, the manga had over 32 million copies in circulation. By August 2022, the manga had over 41 million copies in circulation, including digital versions.

In Japan, The Promised Neverland was the eighth best selling manga in 2018, with over 4.2 million copies sold. It was the fourth best selling manga in 2019, with over 7.4 million copies sold. It was the sixth best selling manga in 2020, with over 6.3 million copies sold. It was the sixth best-selling manga in the first half of 2021, with over 3.1 million copies sold. In 2018, the seventh volume of The Promised Neverland had an initial print run of 400,000 copies. In 2019, volume 18 had received an initial print run of over 600,000 copies; and the 20th volume in 2020 had an initial print run of 700,000 copies printed.

The first volume of The Promised Neverland appeared on The New York Times Best Seller list in March and April 2021. Individual volumes of the manga also ranked on NPD BookScan's monthly top 20 adult graphic novels list several times from 2018 to 2021. The Promised Neverland volume 1 ranked fourth on Publishers Weekly's bestseller list in March 2021. Volume 20 also made Publishers Weekly's bestseller list in September 2021 ranking 10th. The first volume sold 37,000 copies and 77,000 copies in the United States in 2020 and 2021, respectively. Additionally, The Promised Neverland ranked 13th on Rakuten's Top 100 Best Selling Digital Manga of 2021.

Critical reception
Leroy Douresseaux of ComicBookBin gave the first volume a score of 9/10. Douresseaux praised the series for its characters, storytelling, and graphics, saying that the result is "a sinister, dark fantasy, and mystery thriller". Gabe Peralta of The Fandom Post, in his review of the first volume, praised it for its plot twists and suspense, giving it a "B+" and saying "The Promised Neverland feels like a modern Weekly Shōnen Jump comic in every respect—it's energetic and eager to please". Katherine Dacey of The Manga Critic enjoyed the series. Dacey wrote that she liked the world-building, crack pacing, crisp artwork, and a shocking plot twist in the first volume. She also praised the introduction of the principal characters and the main conflict.Anime News Networks Rebecca Silverman enjoyed the first manga volume and gave it an A−, saying, "tense pacing, interesting literary connections, art and story work well together, strong plot and foreshadowing". Nick Creamer of the same website gave the second volume a B+ and called it a "unique and altogether thrilling story offers fun tactical drama and striking visual set pieces". Creamer praised the third volume of the series, saying that Sister Krone and Emma's new allies adds thrilling complexity to a story that is both tightly plotted and thematically biting. Mentioning that, the series continues to be one of the most unique and gripping shōnen tales around. He described the fourth volume as "it offers ever more reasons to check out this very unique manga" with its "excellent world and character-building, laying all the pieces in place for a truly thrilling escape, with a combination of alluring art and sturdy characterization". Creamer gave volume five and six an A−. Praising their transition phase with grace, offering some of the most exciting conflicts and beautiful set pieces of the story so far and pulling off the "big world-building reveal" with such intelligence. Reviewing volumes seven to nine, he wrote that "on the whole, setting the story's ambitions towards a new horizon while reintroducing some of the initial concepts that made this manga so thrilling continues to stride forward with tremendous confidence. The Promised Neverland's eighth volume may well be my favorite volume so far, and Demizu's art has never looked better". Adding that, Goldy Pond translates Neverland's core appeal into action theater, while the art keeps the fighting clear and the monsters terrifying.

Sean Gaffney from A Case Suitable for Treatment praised the storytelling and characters of volume eleven and twelve of the series, saying that "it continues to be one of the best Jump series I have read in years. A must-buy. Continuing to combine the best parts of horror and thrilling adventure, The Promised Neverland is still top-tier Jump". Sean also highlighted the new directions and themes of the series in volume fifteen, concluding with "most of this volume is made up of political intrigue (albeit among demons) and moral/ethical arguments. It is well written, and I think this is a very good volume. This is not The Promised Neverland we started off with, and that is a good thing, even though I do get nostalgic for the old suspense novel feeling. It is still well worth a read". In a review of volume fourteen and fifteen of the series, Wolfen Moondaughter of Sequential Tart says that they like the philosophical discussions of ethics, with great points made on both sides and the creative team did a great job showing the pros and cons of each side, and exploring how morality is not as easily defined or attained as we might wish. Moondaughter also praised the history part of volume sixteen and seventeen, saying that Geelan's story is tragic and offers a great parallel with Norman's, with both of them willing to accept losses now that they would not have accepted once upon a time; they concluded their review of the series by mentioning the story's ending in the final volume, stating "there are some nice final philosophical musings -- one of my favourite things about this series, so I'm glad that is still a hallmark in this last volume, it is fairly good, and made reading the series worthwhile". 

The manga critic and author, Yukari Fujimoto describes the manga as "first of all, although it is a manga published in a shōnen magazine, the main character is a female. A lot of children appear, and the scenes of fighting and communal life are depicted, but there is no difference between men and women in their roles, it is very well balanced. The story development is interesting, and while this work was being serialized, I was looking forward to reading the next volume. Furthermore, at the end of the story, the focus is on expanding the limits and options of both demons and humans. This is also to dismantle the current gender order, such as recognizing the victimhood of men". Manga artist Hiroko Mizoguchi praised the series by saying that the drawings are wonderfully well drawn, the characters are also well drawn, and the story is magnificent and thrilling. She also highlighted the strong female leads. The Gender SF Study Group member Manami Tachibana stated that the story is a tale of adventure and a noble runaway, in which children in an orphanage realize that they are not orphans but farmed children to be eaten by monsters. She described the story as a game where you solve tasks one by one and move on to the next. She concluded by giving Shueisha a round of applause for publishing such a different story from the rest of their published works.

Masaki Tsuji lauded that The Promised Neverland is a manga series that has "a clear start, turn, and conclusion", which he described as "rare for a long story that has gained popularity". He also wrote that it is one of the best series that have ended in recent years. Chengma Lingyi from Real Sound praised the good storytelling and worldview of the series, he also stated that Posuka Demizu's art is very beautiful, elegant, and spectacular. It also underlines the psychology and the suspense of the work, which confronts existence with "wisdom". He noted that in the last arc, in which the monsters eat people and demons at will, is a scene where the theme of this work is illustrated and it is the sad end of those who have monopolized wealth and sacrificed the weak. Lingyi added, "the dilemma of purpose and sacrifice is why The Promised Neverland has become a masterpiece full of reality".

Awards and nominations

Anime
Season 1 of The Promised Neverland holds a 100% on Rotten Tomatoes, based on 5 reviews. In February 2020, the anime series was awarded "Best Fantasy" at Crunchyroll Anime Awards, and Isabella won the "Best Antagonist" category. Polygon named the series as one of the best anime of the 2010s, and Crunchyroll listed it in their "Top 100 best anime of the 2010s". IGN also listed The Promised Neverland among the best anime series of the 2010s. The Brazilian website Legiao Dos Herois listed the series as one of "10 most successful anime" of 2010s.

Lauren Orsini of Forbes included The Promised Neverland on her list of the best anime of the decade. The Verge also listed the anime series in its list of the best anime of 2019. James Beckett of Anime News Network ranked the series fifth on his list of best anime series of 2019. Toussaint Egan of Thrillist ranked the series third on his list of best anime of 2019. Season 2 of The Promised Neverland became the second biggest anime premiere ever on MyAnimeList behind Attack on Titan: The Final Season.

Critical reception
Brittany Vincent, writing a review of the first season for Syfy, praised the twist at the end of episode 1, saying that "Watching a seemingly idyllic community of happy-go-lucky kids seeing their realities destroyed in such a brutal way makes this a show that you just have to continue watching". Vincent particularly praised the animation and character designs saying: "These aren't your generic anime kids, with pink hair and zany costumes. The lead protagonist, Emma, hardly looks like your typical anime character at all, thanks to her shock of reddish blonde hair and her wide eyes". Furthermore, Vincent referred to the series as "A great cross between shows like Deadman Wonderland and Seraph of the End, with dreadfully creepy characters and a narrative that keeps you guessing the whole way through".

Allen Moody of THEM Anime Reviews gave the first season 4 out of 5 stars. Moody praised the series for its story and the characters' ability to "devise amazingly sophisticated strategies (and counter-strategies) that surprise the viewer as much as their foes", adding that the series "maintains a high level of psychological tension throughout, even though we're hit with unexpected explicit horror only a couple of times". Moody concluded: "I was fairly satisfied with the story we have here. There are heartbreaking developments and moments of pure horror, but the unquenchable human spirit is in here too".

The second season of The Promised Neverland, in particular its final episode, received overwhelmingly negative reception for what many felt was a rushed and forced ending. Reviewing the series' second season, Rafael Motamayor of Polygon said that while an original story is not necessarily a bad thing, the season, specifically from episode 5 onwards, broke the pacing and tension of its previous episodes. In comparing it to the 2003 Fullmetal Alchemist anime series, which changed from being a faithful adaptation to have an original story that "still captures the intention of the source material in a satisfying way", Motamayor wrote that The Promised Neverland anime was not planning on telling its own story, but rather skipping the chapters of the manga "to be done with the story as soon as humanly possible", still telling enough story that somewhat resembles the manga's plotline, "but  whatever made it impactful in the first place", adding that it was similar to the final season of Game of Thrones.

Jairus Taylor of Anime News Network wrote that the anime adaptation of The Promised Neverland was a "total disaster". He explained that the anime changed the main focus of the original manga, which was meant to be a horror fantasy, as a "more linear version of Hunter x Hunter", instead of being a mystery thriller ("in the way its earliest chapters suggested"), as "the second coming of Death Note". Taylor commented that the anime "did a pretty good job delivering on suspense", but that it was at the expense of other elements that were vital to the original work's "larger ambitions", including entire cut out or trim down of world-building elements, the lack of internal monologues and characterization that diminished the motivations of certain characters and the simplification of the series' actual themes and its messaging. Regarding the second season, Taylor considered various possible reasons for the staff's decision to make the changes, but he wrote: "Regardless of what went down though, it doesn't really change the reality that the second season faceplanted pretty hard". Taylor concluded: "If the anime had chosen not to skip anything it could have still faced problems since it was arguably poorly equipped to handle anything past Grace Field. Either way, the end result here is really disappointing, The Promised Neverland manga was easily one of the most interesting and thoughtful entries to the shônen jump lineup. It's a shame that its anime counterpart failed to live up to its potential".

Awards and nominations

See also
 Borderliners, a 1993 novel with a similar premise

Notes

References

External links
  
  at Weekly Shōnen Jump'' 
  
  
  at Viz Media
 
 
 

2019 anime television series debuts
Aniplex
Child abuse in fiction
CloverWorks
Crunchyroll Anime Awards winners
Dark fantasy anime and manga
Demons in anime and manga
Dystopian anime and manga 
Human experimentation in fiction
Human trafficking in fiction
Madman Entertainment anime
Manga adapted into films
Noitamina
Orphans in fiction
Science fiction anime and manga
Shueisha manga
Shōnen manga
Television series set in the future
Thriller anime and manga
Toonami
Viz Media manga
Winners of the Shogakukan Manga Award for shōnen manga
Works about human trafficking